SM UC-11 was a German Type UC I minelayer submarine or U-boat in the German Imperial Navy during World War I. The U-boat was ordered on 23 November 1914, laid down on 26 January 1915, and was launched on 11 April 1915. She was commissioned into the German Imperial Navy on 23 April 1915 as SM UC-11. Mines laid by UC-11 in her 83 patrols were credited with sinking 27 ships. UC-11 was mined and sunk on 26 June 1918. A crew member was Rudolf Finkler from Oberlinxweiler, Kreis St. Wendel, Germany. According to his death record the boat went down in the North Sea near Harwich, abt.  north east of Funk Feuerschiff on position .

Design
A German Type UC I submarine, UC-11 had a displacement of  when at the surface and  while submerged. The submarine was powered by one Benz six-cylinder, four-stroke diesel engine producing , an electric motor producing , and one propeller shaft.

UC-11 was fitted with six  mine tubes, twelve UC 120 mines, and one  machine gun. She was built by AG Weser Bremen and her complement was fourteen crew members.

Summary of raiding history

References

Notes

Citations

Bibliography

 
 

German Type UC I submarines
U-boats commissioned in 1915
World War I submarines of Germany
Maritime incidents in 1918
U-boats sunk in 1918
U-boats sunk by mines
1915 ships
World War I minelayers of Germany
Ships built in Bremen (state)
World War I shipwrecks in the North Sea